Josh Dyson was an Australian rules football player who played one game for the Brisbane Lions in the Australian Football League (AFL).

He was selected at pick #32 in the 2010 Rookie Draft from the Eastern Ranges in the TAC Cup. Dyson made his debut in Round 20 of the 2011 season against .  He retained on the Lions' rookie list for the 2012 season, but was delisted at the end of the season without playing another game in the AFL.

References

External links

Josh Dyson Player Profile, Brisbane Lions

1991 births
Living people
Brisbane Lions players
Eastern Ranges players
Australian rules footballers from Victoria (Australia)